Chlorosoma is a genus of snakes of the subfamily Dipsadinae.

Species
 Chlorosoma dunupyana (Melo-Sampaio, Passos, Martins, Jennings, Moura-Leite, Morato, Venegas, Chávez, Venâncio, & De Souza, 2020)
 Chlorosoma laticeps  – Bolivia, Brazil
 Chlorosoma viridissimum  – N South America in Amazon and Paraguay River basins

References

Snake genera
Chlorosoma